Dasht-e Bu (also Romanized as Dasht-e Bū, Dashtboo, and Dasht Bū; also known as Dashtadi and Dashtgū) is a village in Tuyehdarvar Rural District, Amirabad District, Damghan County, Semnan Province, Iran. At the 2006 census, its population was 76, in 30 families.

References 

Populated places in Damghan County